The enzyme aminoacyl-tRNA hydrolase (EC 3.1.1.29) catalyzes the reaction

N-substituted aminoacyl-tRNA + H2O  N-substituted amino acid + tRNA

This enzyme belongs to the family of hydrolases, specifically those acting on carboxylic ester bonds.  The systematic name is aminoacyl-tRNA aminoacylhydrolase. Other names in common use include aminoacyl-transfer ribonucleate hydrolase, N-substituted aminoacyl transfer RNA hydrolase, and peptidyl-tRNA hydrolase.

Structural studies

References

 

EC 3.1.1
Enzymes of known structure